Arachne (from , cognate with Latin ) is the protagonist of a tale in Greek mythology known primarily from the version told by the Roman poet Ovid (43 BCE–17 CE), which is the earliest extant source for the story. In Book Six of his epic poem Metamorphoses, Ovid recounts how the talented mortal Arachne, daughter of Idmon, challenged Minerva, goddess of wisdom and crafts, to a weaving contest. When Minerva could find no flaws in the tapestry Arachne had woven for the contest, the goddess became enraged and beat the girl with her shuttle. After Arachne hanged herself out of shame, she was transformed into a spider. The myth both provides an aetiology of spiders' web-spinning abilities and was a cautionary tale about hubris.

Biography 
According to the myth as recounted by Ovid, Arachne was a Lydian maiden who was the daughter of Idmon of Colophon, who was a famous dyer in purple. She was credited to have invented linen cloth and nets while her son Closter introduced the use of spindle in the manufacture of wool. She was said to have been a native of Hypaepa, near Colophon in Asia Minor.

Mythology

Ovid 

In Metamorphoses the Roman poet Ovid writes that Arachne was a shepherd's daughter who began weaving at an early age. She became a great weaver, boasted that her skill was greater than Athena's, and refused to acknowledge that her skill came, at least in part, from the goddess. Athena took offense and set up a contest between them. Presenting herself as an old lady, she approached the boasting girl and warned: "You can never compare to any of the gods. Plead for forgiveness and Athena might spare your soul."

"Ha! I only speak the truth and if Athena thinks otherwise then let her come down and challenge me herself," Arachne replied. Athena removed her disguise and appeared in shimmering glory, clad in a sparkling white chiton. The two began weaving straight away. Athena's weaving represented four separate contests between mortals and the gods in which the gods punished mortals for setting themselves as equals of the gods. Arachne's weaving depicted ways that the gods, particularly Zeus, had misled and abused mortals, tricking, and seducing many women. When Athena saw that Arachne had not only insulted the gods but done so with a work far more beautiful than Athena's own, she was enraged. She ripped Arachne's work to shreds and hit her on the head three times
 Athena said,"Since you love weaving so much, you shall continue doing so for the rest of your life" After saying this she sprinkled her with the juice of Hecate's herb, and immediately at the touch of this dark poison, Arachne's hair fell out. With it went her nose and ears, her head shrank to the smallest size, and her whole body became tiny. Her slender fingers stuck to her sides as legs, the rest is belly, from which she still spins a thread, and, as a spider, weaves her ancient web."

The myth of Arachne can also be seen as an attempt to show relation between art and tyrannical power in Ovid's time. He wrote under the emperor Augustus and was exiled by him. At the time weaving was a common metaphor for poetry, therefore Arachne's artistry and Athena's censorship to it may offer a provocative allegory of the writer's role under an autocratic regime.

The tapestries 
Athena wove a tapestry with themes of hubris being punished by the gods, as a warning to Arachne against what she was doing, in each of its four corners. Those were Hera and Zeus transforming Rhodope and Haemus into the homonymous mountain ranges, Hera transforming Queen Gerana into a crane for daring to boast of being more beautiful than the queen of the gods, Hera again turning Antigone of Troy into a stork for competing with her, and finally Cinyras' daughter being petrified. Those four tales surrounded the central one, which was Athena and Poseidon's dispute on the areopagus over which would receive the city of Athens; Athena offered an olive tree, and Poseidon a saltwater spring (the Athenians eventually chose Athena). Finally, the goddess surrounded the outer edges with olive wreaths.

Arachne meanwhile chose to include several tales of male gods tricking and deceiving women by assuming other forms instead of their own. She depicted; Zeus transformed into a bull for Europa, an eagle for Asteria, a swan for Leda, a satyr for Antiope, Amphitryon for Alcmene, golden shower for Danaë, flame for Aegina, a shepherd for Mnemosyne, and a snake for Persephone. Poseidon transformed into a bull for Canace, Enipeus for Iphimedeia, a ram for Theophane, a horse for Demeter, a bird for Medusa, and a dolphin for Melantho. Apollo transformed into a shepherd for Issa, and further as a countryman, a hawk and a lion in three more obscure occasions, Dionysus as 'delusive grapes' for Erigone, and finally Cronus as a horse for Philyra. The outer edge of the tapestry had flowers interwoven with entangled ivy.

Other attestations 
In a rarer version, Arachne was a girl from Attica who was taught by Athena the art of weaving, while her brother Phalanx was taught instead martial arts by the goddess. But then the two siblings engaged in incestuous intercourse, so Athena, disgusted, changed them both into spiders, animals doomed to be devoured by their own young.

The earliest written attestation of an Arachne who clashed with Athena comes courtesy of Virgil, who wrote that the spider is hated by Athena. Pliny the Elder wrote that Arachne had a son, Closter, by an unnamed father, who invented the use of the spindle in the manufacture of woollen.

The satirical writer Lucian, around the second century AD, wrote in this work The Gout that the "Maeonian maid Arachne thought herself Athene's match, but she lost her shape and still today must spin and spin her web".

Influence 

The metamorphosis of Arachne in Ovid's telling furnished material for an episode in Edmund Spenser's mock-heroic Muiopotmos, 257–352. Spenser's adaptation, which "rereads an Ovidian story in terms of the Elizabethan world" is designed to provide a rationale for the hatred of Arachne's descendant Aragnoll for the butterfly-hero Clarion.

Dante Alighieri uses Arachne in Canto XVII of Inferno, the first part of The Divine Comedy, to describe the horrible monster Geryon. "His back and all his belly and both flanks were painted arabesques and curlicues: the Turks and Tartars never made a fabric with richer colors intricately woven, nor were such complex webs spun by Arachne." 

The tale of Arachne inspired one of Velázquez' most factual paintings: Las Hilanderas ("The Spinners, or The fable of Arachne", in the Prado), in which the painter represents the two important moments of the myth. In the front, the contest of Arachne and the goddess (the young and the old weaver), in the back, an Abduction of Europa that is a copy of Titian's version (or maybe of Rubens' copy of Titian). In front of it appears Minerva (Athena) at the moment she punishes Arachne. It transforms the myth into a reflection about creation and imitation, god and man, master and pupil (and therefore about the nature of art).

It has also been suggested that Jeremias Gotthelf's nineteenth century novella, The Black Spider, was heavily influenced by the Arachne story from Ovid's Metamorphoses. In the novella, a woman is turned into a venomous spider having reneged on a deal with the devil.

Gallery

See also 

 Cultural depictions of spiders
 Marsyas, a satyr who engaged in a musical contest with Apollo and also suffered for his presumption
 Medusa, who was also transformed as a result of Athena's wrath
 407 Arachne, an asteroid named after Arachne

Footnotes

References

Bibliography

Primary sources 
 Ovid, Metamorphoses vi.1–145
 Pliny the Elder, Naturalis Historia vii.56.196
 Virgil, Georgics iv.246-247

Secondary sources 
 Harry Thurston Peck, Harpers Dictionary of Classical Antiquities (1898) (13.23)

Further reading

External links 
 
 
 
 
 Images of Arachne in the Warburg Institute Iconographic Database 

Women in Greek mythology
Metamorphoses into arthropods in Greek mythology
Mythological spiders
Deeds of Athena
Characters in Roman mythology
Textiles in folklore
Anatolian characters in Greek mythology
Metamorphoses characters
Incest in Greek mythology
Attican characters in Greek mythology